Diana Wilson (born 12 March 1934) is an Irish equestrian. She competed in two events at the 1968 Summer Olympics.

References

1934 births
Living people
Irish female equestrians
Olympic equestrians of Ireland
Equestrians at the 1968 Summer Olympics
Sportspeople from Northampton